Donald Woods Winnicott  (7 April 1896 – 25 January 1971) was an English paediatrician and psychoanalyst who was especially influential in the field of object relations theory and developmental psychology. He was a leading member of the British Independent Group of the British Psychoanalytical Society, President of the British Psychoanalytical Society twice (1956–1959 and 1965–1968), and a close associate of Marion Milner.

Winnicott is best known for his ideas on the true self and false self, the "good enough" parent, and borrowed from his second wife, Clare Winnicott, arguably his chief professional collaborator, the notion of the transitional object. He wrote several books, including Playing and Reality, and over 200 papers.

Early life and education
Winnicott was born on 7 April 1896 in Plymouth, Devon, to Sir John Frederick Winnicott and Elizabeth Martha, daughter of chemist and druggist William Woods, of Plymouth. Sir John Winnicott was a partner in the family firm, in business as hardware merchants and manufacturers, and was knighted in 1924 having served twice as mayor of Plymouth; he was also a magistrate and alderman. The Winnicott family were staunch, civic-minded Methodists.

The family was prosperous and ostensibly happy, but behind the veneer, Winnicott saw himself as oppressed by his mother, who tended toward depression, as well as by his two sisters and his nanny. He would eventually speak of 'his own early childhood experience of trying to make "my living" by keeping his mother alive'. His father's influence was that of an enterprising freethinker who encouraged his son's creativity. Winnicott described himself as a disturbed adolescent, reacting against his own self-restraining "goodness" acquired from trying to assuage the dark moods of his mother. These seeds of self-awareness became the basis of his interest in working with troubled young people.

He first thought of studying medicine while at The Leys School, a boarding school in Cambridge, after fracturing his clavicle and recording in his diary that he wished he could treat himself. He began pre-clinical studies in biology, physiology and anatomy at Jesus College, Cambridge in 1914 but, with the onset of World War I, his studies were interrupted when he was made a medical trainee at the temporary hospital in Cambridge. In 1917, he joined the Royal Navy as a medical officer on the destroyer HMS Lucifer.

Having graduated from Cambridge with a third-class degree, he began studies in clinical medicine at St Bartholomew's Hospital Medical College in London. During this time, he learned from his mentor the art of listening carefully when taking medical histories from patients, a skill that he would later identify as foundational to his practice as a psychoanalyst.

Career
Winnicott completed his medical studies in 1920, and in 1923, the same year as his marriage to the artist Alice Buxton Winnicott (born Taylor). She was a potter and they married on 7 July 1923 in St Mary's Church, Frensham. Alice had "severe psychological difficulties" and Winnicott arranged for her, and his own therapy, to address the difficulties this condition created. He obtained a post as physician at the Paddington Green Children's Hospital in London, where he was to work as a paediatrician and child psychoanalyst for 40 years. In 1923 he began a ten-year psychoanalysis with James Strachey, and in 1927 he began training as an analytic candidate. Strachey discussed Winnicott's case with his wife Alix Strachey, apparently reporting that Winnicott's sex life was affected by his anxieties. Winnicott's second analysis, beginning in 1936, was with Joan Riviere.

Winnicott rose to prominence as a psychoanalyst just as the followers of Anna Freud were in conflict with those of Melanie Klein for the right to be called Sigmund Freud's "true intellectual heirs". Out of the Controversial discussions during World War II, a compromise was reached with three more-or-less amicable groups within the psychoanalytic movement: the "Freudians", the "Kleinians", and the "Middle Group" of the British Psychoanalytical Society (the latter being called the "Independent Group"), to which Winnicott belonged, along with Ronald Fairbairn, Michael Balint, Masud Khan, John Bowlby, Marion Milner, and Margaret Little. 

During the Second World War, Winnicott served as consultant paediatrician to the children's evacuation programme. During the war, he met and worked with Clare Britton, a psychiatric social worker who became his colleague in treating children displaced from their homes by wartime evacuation. Winnicott was lecturing after the war and Janet Quigley and Isa Benzie of the BBC asked him to give over sixty talks on the radio between 1943 and 1966. His first series of talks in 1943 was titled "Happy Children." As a result of the success of these talks, Quigley offered him total control over the content of his talks but this soon became more consultative as Quigley advised him on the correct pitch.

After the war, he also saw patients in his private practice. Among contemporaries influenced by Winnicott was R. D. Laing, who wrote to Winnicott in 1958 acknowledging his help.

Winnicott divorced his first wife in 1949 and married Clare Britton (1906–1984) in 1951. A keen observer of children as a social worker and a psychoanalyst in her own right, she had an important influence on the development of his theories and likely acted as midwife to his prolific publications after they met.

Except for one book published in 1931 (Clinical Notes on Disorders of Childhood), all of Winnicott's books were published after 1944, including The Ordinary Devoted Mother and Her Baby (1949), The Child and the Family (1957), Playing and Reality (1971), and Holding and Interpretation: Fragment of an Analysis (1986).

Winnicott died on 25 January 1971, following the last of a series of heart attacks and was cremated in London. Clare Winnicott oversaw the posthumous publication of several of his works.

Concept of holding
Winnicott's paediatric work with children and their mothers led to the development of his influential concept concerning the "holding environment". Winnicott claimed that "the foundations of health are laid down by the ordinary mother in her ordinary loving care of her own baby", central to which was the mother's attentive holding of her child.

Winnicott considered that the "mother's technique of holding, of bathing, of feeding, everything she did for the baby, added up to the child's first idea of the mother", as well as fostering the ability to experience the body as the place wherein one securely lives. Extrapolating the concept of holding from mother to family and the outside world, Winnicott saw as key to healthy development "the continuation of reliable holding in terms of the ever-widening circle of family and school and social life".

Winnicott was influential in viewing the work of the psychotherapist as offering a substitute holding environment based on the mother/infant bond. Winnicott wrote: “A correct and well-timed interpretation in an analytic treatment gives a sense of being held physically that is more real...than if a real holding or nursing had taken place. Understanding goes deeper”.

His theoretical writings emphasised empathy, imagination, and, in the words of philosopher Martha Nussbaum, who has been a proponent of his work, "the highly particular transactions that constitute love between two imperfect people."

Anti-social tendency
Connected to the concept of holding is what Winnicott called the anti-social tendency, something which he argued "may be found in a normal individual, or in one that is neurotic or psychotic". The delinquent child, Winnicott thought, was looking for a sense of secure holding lacking in their family of origin from society at large. He considered antisocial behaviour as a cry for help, fuelled by a sense of loss of integrity, when the familial holding environment was inadequate or ruptured.

Play and the sense of being real
One of the elements that Winnicott considered could be lost in childhood was what he called the sense of being for him, a primary element, of which a sense of doing is only a derivative. The capacity for being the ability to feel genuinely alive inside, which Winnicott saw as essential to the maintenance of a true self was fostered in his view by the practice of childhood play.

In contrast to the emphasis in orthodox psychoanalysis upon generating insight into unconscious processes, Winnicott considered that playing was the key to emotional and psychological well-being. It is likely that he first came upon this notion from his collaboration in wartime with the psychiatric social worker, Clare Britton, (later a psychoanalyst and his second wife) who in 1945 published an article on the importance of play for children. By "playing", he meant not only the ways that children of all ages play, but also the way adults "play" through making art, or engaging in sports, hobbies, humour, meaningful conversation, et cetera. At any age, he saw play as crucial to the development of authentic selfhood, because when people play they feel real, spontaneous and alive, and keenly interested in what they're doing. He thought that insight in psychoanalysis was helpful when it came to the patient as a playful experience of creative, genuine discovery; dangerous when patients were pressured to comply with their analyst's authoritative interpretations, thus potentially merely reinforcing a patient's false self. Winnicott believed that it was only in playing that people are entirely their true selves, so it followed that for psychoanalysis to be effective, it needed to serve as a mode of playing.

Two of the techniques whereby Winnicott used play in his work with children were the squiggle game and the spatula game.  The first involved Winnicott drawing a shape for the child to play with and extend (or vice versa) a practice extended by his followers into that of using partial interpretations as a 'squiggle' for a patient to make use of.

The second, more famous instance involved Winnicott placing a spatula (tongue depressor) within the child's reach for him to play with. Winnicott considered that "if he is just an ordinary baby he will notice the attractive object...and he will reach for it....[then] in the course of a little while he will discover what he wants to do with it". From the child's initial hesitation in making use of the spatula, Winnicott derived his idea of the necessary 'period of hesitation' in childhood (or analysis), which makes possible a true connection to the toy, interpretation or object presented for transference.

Many of Winnicott's writings show his efforts to understand what helps people to be able to play, and on the other hand what blocks some people from playing. Babies can be playful when they're cared for by people who respond to them warmly and playfully, like a mother who smiles and says, "Peek-a-boo!" when she sees her baby playfully peeking out from behind his hands. If the mother never responded playfully, sooner or later the baby would stop trying to elicit play from her.  Indeed, Winnicott came to consider that "Playing takes place in the potential space between the baby and the mother-figure....[T]he initiation of playing is associated with the life experience of the baby who has come to trust the mother figure". "Potential space" was Winnicott's term for a sense of an inviting and safe interpersonal field in which one can be spontaneously playful while at the same time connected to others (again a concept that has been extrapolated to the practice of analysis).

Playing can also be seen in the use of a transitional object, Winnicott's term for an object, such as a teddy bear, that has a quality for a small child of being both real and made-up at the same time. Winnicott pointed out that no one demands that a toddler explain whether his Binky is a "real bear" or a creation of the child's own imagination, and went on to argue that it's very important that the child is allowed to experience the Binky as being in an undefined, "transitional" status between the child's imagination and the real world outside the child. For Winnicott, one of the most important and precarious stages of development was in the first three years of life, when an infant grows into a child with an increasingly separate sense of self in relation to a larger world of other people. In health, the child learns to bring his or her spontaneous, real self into play with others; in a false self disorder, the child has found it unsafe or impossible to do so, and instead feels compelled to hide the true self from other people, and pretend to be whatever they want instead. Playing with a transitional object can be an important early bridge between self and other, which helps a child develop the capacity to be genuine in relationships, and creative.

Playing for Winnicott ultimately extended all the way up from earliest childhood experience to what he called "the abstractions of politics and economics and philosophy and culture...this 'third area', that of cultural experience which is a derivative of play".

True self and false self

Winnicott wrote that "a word like self...knows more than we do.". He meant that, while philosophical and psychoanalytic ideas about the self could be very complex and arcane, with a great deal of specialised jargon, there was a pragmatic usefulness to the ordinary word "self" with its range of traditional meanings. For example, where other psychoanalysts used the Freudian terminology of ego and id to describe different functions of a person's psychology, Winnicott at times used "self" to refer to both. For Winnicott, the self is a very important part of mental and emotional well-being which plays a vital role in creativity. He thought that people were born without a clearly developed self and had to "search" for an authentic sense of self as they grew. "For Winnicott, the sense of feeling real, feeling in touch with others and with one's own body and its processes was essential for living a life."

True self
"Only the true self can be creative and only the true self can feel real." For Winnicott, the True Self is a sense of being alive and real in one's mind and body, having feelings that are spontaneous and unforced. This experience of aliveness is what allows people to be genuinely close to others, and to be creative.

Winnicott thought that the "True Self" begins to develop in infancy, in the relationship between the baby and its primary caregiver (Winnicott typically refers to this person as "the mother"). One of the ways the mother helps the baby develop an authentic self is by responding in a welcoming and reassuring way to the baby's spontaneous feelings, expressions, and initiatives. In this way the baby develops a confidence that nothing bad happens when she expresses what she feels, so her feelings don't seem dangerous or problematic to her, and she doesn't have to put undue attention into controlling or avoiding them. She also gains a sense that she is real, that she exists and her feelings and actions have meaning.

Winnicott thought that one of the developmental hurdles for an infant to get past is the risk of being traumatised by having to be too aware too soon of how small and helpless she really is. A baby who is too aware of real-world dangers will be too anxious to learn optimally. A good-enough parent is well enough attuned and responsive to protect the baby with an illusion of omnipotence, or being all-powerful. For example, a well-cared-for baby usually doesn't feel hungry for very long before being fed. Winnicott thought the parents' quick response of feeding the baby gives the baby a sense that whenever she's hungry, food appears as if by magic, as if the baby herself makes food appear just by being hungry. To feel this powerful, Winnicott thought, allowed a baby to feel confident, calm and curious, and able to learn without having to invest a lot of energy into defences.

False self
In Winnicott's writing, the "False Self" is a defence, a kind of mask of behaviour that complies with others' expectations. Winnicott thought that in health, a False Self was what allowed one to present a "polite and mannered attitude" in public.

But he saw more serious emotional problems in patients who seemed unable to feel spontaneous, alive or real to themselves anywhere, in any part of their lives, yet managed to put on a successful "show of being real". Such patients suffered inwardly from a sense of being empty, dead or "phoney".

Winnicott thought that this more extreme kind of False Self began to develop in infancy, as a defence against an environment that felt unsafe or overwhelming because of a lack of reasonably attuned caregiving. He thought that parents did not need to be perfectly attuned, but just "ordinarily devoted" or "good enough" to protect the baby from often experiencing overwhelming extremes of discomfort and distress, emotional or physical. But babies who lack this kind of external protection, Winnicott thought, had to do their best with their own crude defences.

One of the main defences Winnicott thought a baby could resort to was what he called "compliance", or behaviour motivated by a desire to please others rather than spontaneously express one's own feelings and ideas. For example, if a baby's caregiver was severely depressed, the baby would anxiously sense a lack of responsiveness, would not be able to enjoy an illusion of omnipotence, and might instead focus his energies and attentions on finding ways to get a positive response from the distracted and unhappy caregiver by being a "good baby". The "False Self" is a defence of constantly seeking to anticipate others' demands and complying with them, as a way of protecting the "True Self" from a world that is felt to be unsafe.

Winnicott thought that the "False Self" developed through a process of introjection (a concept developed early on by Freud) or internalising one's experience of others. Instead of basing his personality on his own unforced feelings, thoughts, and initiatives, the person with a "False Self" disorder would essentially be imitating and internalising other people's behaviour a mode in which he could outwardly come to seem "just like" his mother, father, brother, nurse, or whoever had dominated his world, but inwardly he would feel bored, empty, dead, or "phoney". Winnicott saw this as an unconscious process: not only others but also the person himself would mistake his False Self for his real personality. But even with the appearance of success, and of social gains, he would feel unreal and lack the sense of  really being alive or happy.

The division of the True and False self roughly develops from Freud's (1923) notion of the Superego which compels the Ego to modify and inhibit libidinal Id impulses, possibly leading to excessive repression but certainly altering the way the environment is perceived and responded to. However it is not a close equation as the Id, Ego and Superego are complex and dynamic inter-related systems that do not fit well into such a dichotomy. The theory more closely resembles Carl Rogers’ simplified notions of the Real and Ideal self. According to Winnicott, in every person the extent of division between True and False Self can be placed on a continuum between the healthy and the pathological. The True Self, which in health gives the person a sense of being alive, real, and creative, will always be in part or in whole hidden; the False Self is a compliant adaptation to the environment, but in health it does not dominate the person's internal life or block him from feeling spontaneous feelings, even if he chooses not to express them. The healthy False Self feels that it is still being true to the True Self. It can be compliant to expectations but without feeling that it has betrayed its "True Self".

Winnicott on Carl Jung

Winnicott's assessment of the other great pioneer of psychoanalysis, Carl Jung, appeared when he published an extensive review of Jung's partially autobiographical work, Memories, Dreams, Reflections. In it Winnicott focuses on the first three chapters of the work that:  He discusses Jung's evident early experiences of psychotic illness from around the age of four, from within his own theoretical framework. He goes on to comment on the relationship between Freud and Jung. He also discusses the Jungian ‘unconscious’ and Jung's concept of the ‘self’.

Criticism and influence
Winnicott's theoretical elusiveness has been linked to his efforts to modify Kleinian views. Yet whereas from a Kleinian standpoint, his repudiation of the concepts of envy and the death drive were a resistant retreat from the harsh realities she had found in infant life, he has also been accused of being too close to Klein, of sharing in her regressive shift of focus away from the Oedipus complex to the pre-oedipal.

The psychoanalyst, Jan Abram, a former director of the Squiggle Foundation, intended to promote Winnicott's work, who therefore may be said to be partisan, has proposed a coherent interpretation for the omission of Winnicott's theories from many mainstream psychoanalytic trainings. His view of the environment and use of accessible everyday language, addressing the parent community, as opposed to just the Kleinian psychoanalytic community, may account in part for the distancing and making him somewhat "niche".

Winnicott has also been accused of identifying himself in his theoretical stance with an idealised mother, in the tradition of mother (Madonna) and child. Related is his downplaying of the importance of the erotic in his work, as well as the Wordsworthian Romanticism of his cult of childhood play (exaggerated still further in some of his followers).

His theories of the true/false self may have been over-influenced by his own childhood experience of caring for a depressed mother, which resulted in the development of a prematurely mature self which he was only subsequently able to undo.

Nevertheless, Winnicott remains one of the few twentieth-century analysts who, in stature, breadth, minuteness of observations, and theoretical fertility can legitimately be compared to Sigmund Freud.

He has been a major influence for the American psychoanalyst Thomas Ogden, and the Italian psychoanalysts Giuseppe Civitarese and Antonino Ferro, all of which have cited Winnicott's interest in play as being central to their work. He has also strongly influenced the work of Adam Phillips.

Along with Jacques Derrida, Winnicott is a fundamental resource for philosopher Bernard Stiegler's What Makes Life Worth Living: On Pharmacology (2010).

Bibliography
 Clinical Notes on Disorders of Childhood (London: Heinemann, 1931)
   C. Britton and D. W. Winnicott, "The problem of homeless children". The New Era in Home and School. 25, 1944, 155-161
 Getting To Know Your Baby (London: Heinemann, 1945)
 The Child and the Family (London: Tavistock, 1957)
 The Child and the Outside World (London: Tavistock, 1957)
 Collected Papers: Through Paediatrics to Psychoanalysis (London: Tavistock, 1958)
 Review: Memories, Dreams, Reflections: By C. G. Jung (London: Collins and Routledge, 1963). Donald W. Winnicott. DOI:10.1093/med:psych/9780190271398.003.0016
 The Child, the Family and the Outside World (London: Pelican Books, 1964)
 The Family and Individual Development (London: Tavistock, 1965)
 Maturational Processes and the Facilitating Environment: Studies in the Theory of Emotional Development (London: Hogarth Press, 1965)
 Playing and Reality (London: Tavistock, 1971)
 Therapeutic Consultation in Child Psychiatry (London: Hogarth Press, 1971)
 The Piggle: An Account of the Psychoanalytic Treatment of a Little Girl (London: Hogarth Press, 1971)

Posthumous
 
 Deprivation and Delinquency (London: Tavistock, 1984)
 Human Nature (Winnicott Trust, 1988) notebooks

See also

Notes

References

Further reading
 Adam Phillips, Winnicott (Harvard University Press, 1988)
 Michael Jacobs, D. W. Winnicott (SAGE Publications, 1995) 
 Michael Eigen, "The Electrified Tightrope" (Karnac Books, 2004)
 Michael Eigen, "Flames From the Unconscious: Trauma, Madness and Faith", Chapters Two and Three (Karnac Books, 2009)
 Michael Eigen, "Faith", Chapters Three and Four (Karnac Books, 2014)

External links
 The Squiggle Foundation, London
 The Winnicott Foundation, London

1896 births
1971 deaths
Medical doctors from Plymouth, Devon
People educated at The Leys School
Alumni of Jesus College, Cambridge
Royal Navy Medical Service officers
Royal Navy officers of World War I
Converts to Anglicanism from Methodism
English Anglicans
Alumni of the Medical College of St Bartholomew's Hospital
History of mental health in the United Kingdom
Analysands of Joan Riviere
British paediatricians
British psychoanalysts
Child psychiatrists
Epistemologists
Positive psychologists
British cognitive scientists
Developmental psychologists
English medical writers
Object relations theorists